Cristoforo Agosta or Agosti or Augusta (16-17th century) was an Italian painter of the Mannerist style.

Biography
Agosta was born in Casalmaggiore. He was a pupil of Giovanni Battista Trotti and active in Cremona. The 18th-century art historian Giovanni Battista Zaist assigned to him the Marriage of Santa Caterina, once in the church of San Domenico in Cremona (now in the Pinacoteca of Cremona).

References

Year of birth missing
Year of death missing
16th-century Italian painters
Italian male painters
17th-century Italian painters
Painters from Cremona
Italian Mannerist painters